Mauricio Rodríguez (Mexico City, 1976) is a Mexican composer (not to be confused with Cuban jazz composer Mauricio J. Rodriguez).

He holds a Doctor of Musical Arts degree in Composition granted by Stanford University, where he worked with Brian Ferneyhough as advisor. He earned the bachelor's degree in composition and the master's degree in Sonology at the Royal Conservatory of The Hague in the Netherlands, where he studied with Clarence Barlow (composition), Konrad Bohemer (electronic music) and Paul Berg (computer programming). Formerly he also studied composition, piano and ethnomusicology at the Laboratory of Musical Creation led by Julio Estrada at the National School of Music (UNAM).

His musical writing is influenced by processes of graphical representation, by a multi-parametric conception of sound and musical structure, by intuitive-based algorithmic processes and by experimentation as a fundamental method of construction. His output includes musical scores for a variety of instrumental soli, instrumental ensambles, and electronics/electroacoustics.

Publications
Rodríguez, Mauricio (editor). 2020. Musicians' Migratory Patterns: American-Mexican Border Lands. London: Routledge. ISBN 9780367498160

Sources
Terrazas, Wilfrido. 2009. “Islas B: Mauricio Rodríguez” (interview). Revista electrónica Redes Música, 4(5).

References

External links 
 Personal website
 Babel Scores
 

1976 births
Mexican composers
Mexican male composers
Stanford University alumni
Royal Conservatory of The Hague alumni
National Autonomous University of Mexico alumni
Living people